Josef Suk (4 January 1874 – 29 May 1935) was a Czech composer and violinist. He studied under Antonín Dvořák, whose daughter he married.

Biography
From a young age, Josef Suk (born in Křečovice, Bohemia) was deeply involved and well trained in music. He learned organ, violin, and piano from his father, Josef Suk Sr., and was trained further in violin by the Czech violinist Antonín Bennewitz. His theory studies were conducted with several other composers including Josef Bohuslav Foerster, Karel Knittl, and Karel Stecker. He later focused his writing on chamber works under the teachings of Hanuš Wihan. Despite extensive musical training, his musical skill was often said to be largely inherited. Though he continued his lessons with Wihan another year after the completion of his schooling, Suk's greatest inspiration came from another of his teachers, Czech composer Antonín Dvořák.

Known as one of Dvořák's favorite pupils, Suk also became personally close to his mentor. Underlying this was Dvořák's respect for Suk, reflected in Suk's 1898 marriage to Dvořák's daughter, Otilie, marking some of the happiest times in the composer's life and music. However, the last portion of Suk's life was punctuated with tragedy. Over the span of 14 months around 1905, not only did Suk's mentor Dvořák die, but so did Otilie. These events inspired Suk's Asrael Symphony.

Owing to a shared heritage—and the coincidence of their dying within a few months of one another—Suk has been closely compared, in works and style, to fellow Czech composer Otakar Ostrčil. Suk, alongside Vitezslav Novak and Ostrčil, is considered one of the leading composers in Czech Modernism, with much shared influence among the three coming in turn from Dvořák. Eminent German figures such as composer Johannes Brahms and critic Eduard Hanslick recognized Suk's work during his time with the Czech Quartet. Over time, well known Austrian composers such as Gustav Mahler and Alban Berg also began to take notice of Suk and his work.

Although he wrote mostly instrumental music, Suk occasionally branched out into other genres. Orchestral music was his strong suit, notably the Serenade for Strings, Op. 6 (1892). His time with the Czech Quartet, though performing successful concerts until his retirement, was not always met with public approval. Several anti-Dvořák campaigns came into prominence; criticism not only being directed at the quartet, but towards Suk specifically. The leftist critic Zdeněk Nejedlý accused the Czech Quartet of inappropriately playing concerts in the Czech lands during World War I. While these attacks diminished Suk's spirits, they did not hinder his work.

Private life
Suk married Dvorak's daughter, Otýlie, in 1898. They had one child, a son, also named Josef, in 1898. Otýlie died of heart failure aged 27 in 1905, a year after her father. Josef Suk Jr. in turn was father of the acclaimed violinist Josef Suk, who died in 2011.
Suk retired in 1933, although he continued to be a valuable and inspirational public figure to the Czechs. 

Suk died on 29 May 1935, in Benešov, Czechoslovakia (now Czech Republic); he was buried in the cemetery of St Luke's Church, Křečovice.

Musical style

Suk's musical style started off with a heavy influence from his mentor, Dvořák. The biggest change of Suk's style came after he reached a "dead end" in his early musical style (music played less of a role in Suk's life outside of his schooling), just before he began a stylistic shift during 1897–1905, perhaps realizing that the strong influence of Dvořák would limit his work. Morbidity was always a large factor in Suk's music. For instance, he wrote his own funeral march in 1889 and it appears significantly also in a major work, the "funeral symphony" Asrael, Op. 27. Ripening, a symphonic poem, was also a story of pain and questioning the value of life. Other works, however – such as the music he set to Julius Zeyer's drama Radúz a Mahulena – display his happiness, which he credited to his marriage with Otilie. Another of Suk's works, Pohádka (Fairy Tale), was drawn from his work with Radúz a Mahulena. The closest Suk came to opera is in his incidental music to the play Pod jabloní (Beneath the Apple Tree).

The majority of Suk's papers are kept in Prague. There is also a new catalogue of Suk's works that contains more manuscripts than any before it, some of them also containing sketches by Suk.

Suk said of himself: "I do not bow to anyone, except to my own conscience and to our noble Lady Music… and yet at the same time I know that thereby I serve my country, and praise the great people from the period of our wakening who taught us to love our country."

See also
 Josef Suk Museum, formerly the composer's home in Křečovice

References

Citations

Sources

External links

  at the 'Indian Summer in Levoča' Festival, 2008.
 Photo of Josef and Otilie Suk in a Dvořák Family Photo Gallery
 
 Josef Suk: Piano Works
 Meet … Czech composer and violinist Josef Suk 
 Josef Suk Piano Quartet Op. 1, Piano Trio in c, Op. 2 and String Quartet No. 1, Op. 11 Soundbites and discussion of works
 Josef Suk's academic genealogy entry

1874 births
1935 deaths
19th-century classical composers
19th-century classical violinists
19th-century Czech male musicians
20th-century classical composers
20th-century classical violinists
20th-century Czech male musicians
Czech classical violinists
Czech male classical composers
Czech Romantic composers
Male classical violinists
Medalists at the 1932 Summer Olympics
Olympic competitors in art competitions
Olympic silver medalists for Czechoslovakia
Olympic silver medalists in art competitions
People from Benešov District
People from the Kingdom of Bohemia